Into the Sun is the fourth studio album by Seattle post-grunge band Candlebox. Released in 2008, it is their first album since 1998's Happy Pills and would mark both the band's studio return after a seven-year hiatus as well as their first album with Silent Majority Group.

Recording and background
In 2005, Kevin Martin wrote a song entitled "Stand." However, he felt the track didn't suit his current band, Hiwatts, and that it was "just too Candlebox." By the following year, Rhino Records, through Warner Bros., contacted Martin regarding an upcoming Candlebox best-of compilation. Martin and Peter Klett favored the idea and decided the band should tour for its promotion, thus ending their indefinite hiatus.

After a successful tour, bassist Bardi Martin left the band to continue his education, allowing Adam Kury to take his place. Candlebox wrote new material from November 2006 through January the following year; however, this would all be discarded as it was considered poor. They began writing more material soon after, prompting Martin to introduce "Stand" to his bandmates. While chemistry did not set in immediately during the writing process, Klett noted that old issues between bandmates were able to gradually subside.

Much like with their debut album, Candlebox performed the new songs live for several months to ensure their quality. Recording for Into the Sun began that year and took a mere five weeks. Peter Klett came up with the working title Play the Movie which gained some support but was ultimately discarded.

Into the Sun features three of the founding four members of Candlebox; only Martin has been replaced by Kury. Tracks 1, 3, 4, 6, 7, 8, 9, and 10 all feature drums by Dave Krusen, who previously joined the band from 1997 to 1999.

Music and lyrics
Kevin Martin described Into the Sun in a 2007 interview:

Touring and promotion
Candlebox toured extensively in promotion of Into the Sun including the Heritage and Freedom Fest in front of a record crowd. On August 9, 2010, the band also kicked off a five-show stint overseas performing for U.S. troops at Camp Arifjan in Kuwait and continued on to Iraq.

The song "Stand" was released as a single and found considerable radio play. According to Martin, the song was "inspired by the second elected term of George Bush, and how people didn't figure out the first time around that he's a complete and utter buffoon. But more so, it's about society in general, and the fact that you’ve got to pull your head out of the sand and reclaim this country."

To provide the album further exposure, the band released five songs, two weeks apart, leading up to the release Into the Sun. "Surrendering," "Miss You," and "A Kiss Before" were also released as singles.

Track listing
"Stand" – 3:30
"Bitches Brewin'" – 3:37
"Surrendering" – 3:29
"Into the Sun" – 4:53
"Underneath It All" – 3:36
"Miss You" – 5:07
"How Does It Feel" – 3:57
"A Kiss Before" – 3:27
"Breathe Me In (Intro)" – 3:19
"Breathe Me In" – 5:12
"Lover – Come Back to Me" – 4:43
"Consider Us" – 4:09
Amazon Store & iTunes Store bonus track
"The Answer"  – 6:37

Personnel

Candlebox
Kevin Martin – lead vocals
Peter Klett – lead guitar
Sean Hennesy - rhythm guitar
Adam Kury – bass
Scott Mercado – drums 

Additional musicians and production
Dave Krusen – drums 
Ron Aniello – production
Clif Norrell – engineer, mixing
Gregory Reaves – mixing

References

2008 albums
Candlebox albums
Albums produced by Ron Aniello